Ñorquincó is a department in Río Negro Province, Argentina.

External links
 Provincial website

Departments of Río Negro Province